The 2016 Alpha Energy Solutions 250 was the 3rd stock car race of the 2016 NASCAR Camping World Truck Series, and the 22nd iteration of the event. The race was held on Saturday, April 2, 2016, in Ridgeway, Virginia at Martinsville Speedway, a 0.526 mile (0.847 km) permanent paperclip shaped short track. The race was increased from 250 laps to 255 laps, due to a NASCAR overtime finish. Kyle Busch, driving for his team, Kyle Busch Motorsports, held off John Hunter Nemechek on the final restart, and earned his 45th career NASCAR Camping World Truck Series win, along with his first of the season. To fill out the podium, William Byron, also driving for Kyle Busch Motorsports, would finish in 3rd, respectively.

Background 

Martinsville Speedway is a NASCAR-owned stock car racing short track in Ridgeway, Virginia, just south of Martinsville. At  in length, it is the shortest track in the NASCAR Cup Series. The track was also one of the first paved oval tracks in stock car racing, being built in 1947 by partners H. Clay Earles, Henry Lawrence, and Sam Rice, nearly a year before NASCAR was officially formed. It is also the only race track that has been on the NASCAR circuit from its beginning in 1948. Along with this, Martinsville is the only oval track on the NASCAR circuit to have asphalt surfaces on the straightaways and concrete to cover the turns.

Entry list 

 (R) denotes rookie driver.
 (i) denotes driver who is ineligible for series driver points.

Notes

Practice

First practice 
The first practice session was held on Friday, April 1, at 10:00 AM EST, and would last for 55 minutes.

Second practice 
The second practice session was held on Friday, April 1, at 12:30 PM EST, and would last for 1 hour and 25 minutes.

Final practice 
The final practice session was held on Friday, April 1, at 3:00 PM EST, and would last for 50 minutes.

Qualifying 
Qualifying was held on Saturday, April 2, at 11:15 AM EST. Since Martinsville Speedway is under 1.5 miles (2.4 km) in length, the qualifying system was a multi-car system that included three rounds. The first round was 15 minutes, where every driver would be able to set a lap within the 15 minutes. Then, the second round would consist of the fastest 24 cars in Round 1, and drivers would have 10 minutes to set a lap. Round 3 consisted of the fastest 12 drivers from Round 2, and the drivers would have 5 minutes to set a time. Whoever was fastest in Round 3 would win the pole. 

Austin Wayne Self, Jordan Anderson, Travis Kvapil, Norm Benning, Chris Fontaine, and Natalie Decker would fail to qualify.

Full qualifying results

Race results

Standings after the race 

Drivers' Championship standings

Note: Only the first 8 positions are included for the driver standings.

References 

NASCAR races at Martinsville Speedway
April 2016 sports events in the United States
2016 in sports in Virginia